Hailemaryam Kiros (born 5 February 1997) is an Ethiopian long-distance runner. In 2020, he competed in the men's race at the 2020 World Athletics Half Marathon Championships held in Gdynia, Poland.

References

External links 
 

Living people
1997 births
Place of birth missing (living people)
Ethiopian male long-distance runners
21st-century Ethiopian people